That Good Feelin is an album by jazz organist Johnny "Hammond" Smith recorded for the New Jazz label in 1959.

Reception

AllMusic awarded the album 4 stars stating "A standards-heavy set from 1959, Johnny "Hammond" Smith's That Good Feelin is indicative of his early style".

Track listing
All compositions by Johnny "Hammond" Smith except where noted.
 "That Good Feelin'" – 5:36
 "Bye Bye Blackbird" (Mort Dixon, Ray Henderson) – 4:29
 "Autumn Leaves" (Joseph Kosma, Johnny Mercer, Jacques Prévert) – 4:25
 "I'll Remember April" (Gene de Paul, Patricia Johnston, Don Raye) – 4:37
 "Billie's Bounce" (Charlie Parker) – 5:32
 "My Funny Valentine" (Lorenz Hart, Richard Rodgers) – 4:34
 "Puddin'" – 5:13

Personnel
Johnny "Hammond" Smith – organ
Thornel Schwartz – guitar
George Tucker – bass
Leo Stevens – drums

Production
 Esmond Edwards – producer
 Rudy Van Gelder – engineer

References

Johnny "Hammond" Smith albums
1959 albums
New Jazz Records albums
Albums produced by Esmond Edwards
Albums recorded at Van Gelder Studio